Ralph Empey (22 September 1904 – 28 September 1960) was an Australian rules footballer who played with Richmond in the Victorian Football League (VFL).

Football
Empey played his early football at Scotch College and made his first VFL appearance in 1924.

In his 49-game career he played in nine finals, including two grand finals, both of which Richmond lost. He kicked two goals from a forward pocket in the 1928 Grand Final and was a half forward flanker in the premiership decider a year later.

In Round 1, 1930, he was the first player ever substituted into a VFL match following the introduction of the 19th man rule that year, replacing the injured Hope Collins at three-quarter time.

Cricket
Empey was also a capable cricketer, and as a journeyman in district cricket played a total of 79 first XI games for Melbourne, Richmond, University and Carlton between 1923-24 and 1938-39, averaging 21.1 with the bat and taking 91 wickets at 28.1 with the ball.

Notes

References
 Hogan P: The Tigers Of Old, Richmond FC, (Melbourne), 1996. 

1904 births
1960 deaths
People educated at Scotch College, Melbourne
Australian rules footballers from Victoria (Australia)
Australian Rules footballers: place kick exponents
Richmond Football Club players